The Workers' Trade Union Confederation of Mali (CSTM) is a national trade union center in Mali. It is composed of four trade unions which broke from the National Workers' Union of Mali (UNTM) in 1997.

The CSTM is affiliated with the International Trade Union Confederation.

References

Trade unions in Mali
International Trade Union Confederation
Trade unions established in 1997